Mohamed Abdelkrim Derkaoui (born March 29, 1945 in Oujda) is a Moroccan director and producer.

Biography 
Derkaoui attended the National Film School in Łódź, Poland, where he graduated in 1972. He is the brother of director Mostafa Derkaoui and the uncle of cinematographer Kamal Derkaoui. Upon his return to Morocco, he became one of the most renowned directors of photography in the profession. As such, he has worked on some thirty feature films, numerous short films and documentaries as well as several TV movies, soap operas and cultural programs.

Filmography

Director 
 1984: Le jour du forain
 1998: Rue le Caire
2009: Chroniques blanches
 2010: Les Enfants terribles de Casablanca
 2014: Les griffes du passé

Director of photography 
 1974 : About Some Meaningless Events
 1978 : Les cendres du Clos
 1979 : Deux moins un
 1981 : Les beaux jours de Chahrazade 
 1981 : Annoûra ou Le jour du forain
 1982 : Des pas dans le brouillard
 1983 : Cauchemar 
 1983 : Titre provisoire 
 1984 : Les Immigrés
 1989 : Fiction première
 Un amour à Casablanca
 Le marteau et l’enclume 
 1990 :La fête des autres
 Chronique d’une vie normale
 2008: Itto titrit

References

External links 
 

Moroccan film directors
Moroccan cinematographers
Moroccan film producers